Thomas Neilson (15 March 1935 – 10 February 2018) was a Scottish former footballer who played wing-half. Neilson played for East Fife, Dundee United and – briefly – Cowdenbeath. He emigrated to South Africa in 1970 and died there in February 2018.

References 

 15 February 2019

1935 births
2018 deaths
Sportspeople from Midlothian
Association football wing halves
Scottish footballers
Scottish expatriate footballers
Arniston Rangers F.C. players
Heart of Midlothian F.C. players
East Fife F.C. players
Dundee United F.C. players
Dallas Tornado players
Cowdenbeath F.C. players
Scottish Football League players
United Soccer Association players
Scottish Junior Football Association players
Expatriate soccer players in the United States
Scottish expatriate sportspeople in the United States